Lankadeepa is a daily Sri Lankan Sinhala language newspaper which is owned by Wijeya Newspapers. They were established in 1991. The Chairman of the organisation is Ranjith Wijewardene, the son of D. R. Wijewardena. The newspaper's coverage includes politics, sports, entertainment and military. The weekend newspaper, named Irida Lankadeepa, is published on Sundays.

Irida Lankadeepa won the SLIM-Nielsen People's Awards in 2006, 2007, 2008, and 2010 as Sri Lanka's most popular weekend newspaper. Its sister newspapers are The Sunday Times, The Daily Mirror and Tamil Mirror. Daily Lankadeepa has an average circulation of 150,000 while its Sunday edition 350,000.

See also
List of newspapers in Sri Lanka

References

External links

Wijaya Newspapers
BBC Sri Lanka media

Daily newspapers published in Sri Lanka
Publications established in 1991
Sinhala-language newspapers published in Sri Lanka
Wijeya Newspapers
1991 establishments in Sri Lanka